Paul Kern may refer to:

 Paul Kern (insomniac), Hungarian who was supposedly unable to sleep
 Paul J. Kern (born 1945), United States Army officer